Tribal class can refer to several classes of warship:
 Tribal-class destroyer (1905) or F class, 12 destroyers built for the Royal Navy during the early 1900s and operating during World War I
 Tribal-class destroyer (1936) or Afridi class, 27 destroyers built for the navies of the United Kingdom, Canada, and Australia that served during World War II
  or Type 81, seven frigates built for the Royal Navy during the late 1950s and early 1960s, four of which were later operated by the Indonesian Navy
 General Purpose Frigate, a cancelled Canadian procurement project of the 1960s also called the "Tribal-class frigate"
  or Tribal class, four vessels built for the Canadian Forces in the early 1970s